Sofreh Mâhi ("Eagle ray") is an Iranian stealth UCAV under development. Little is known about the drone but scaled down mock-ups shown during Iranian Army Day 2010 parade show that it has a flat diamond shape body with twin vertical stabilizers. First reference to the drone was given by Lieutenant Commander of the Iranian Air Force General Aziz Nasirzadeh who reported that the first tests of the drone were finished.

Development 

Iran officially stated that it is working on a stealth UCAV named Sofreh Mahi on 7 Feb. 2010. Iranian officials reported that the drone has a shape similar to the Eagle ray resulting in the drone being called the Sofreh Mahi (the Persian for "Eagle Ray"). The drone is also made out of special materials that absorb radar energy. These two features give it the ability to evade enemy radars.

General Aziz Nasirzadeh, Lieutenant Commander of the Iranian Army Air Force, stated that the UAV 'Sofreh Mahi' has been designed and manufactured for reconnaissance and bombing missions, considering its radar-evading capability.

General Nasirzadeh also announced that once the aircraft passes further tests, and its features and capabilities are completed, the Defense Ministry will begin the production. "Production of the actual size as well as mounting and testing weapons and a number of systems on the aircraft are the next phases before we can start its mass production", Nasirzadeh said.

In February 2011 Iran announced that it is going to build and test a real scale model of the plane, however this is a long process and can take a long time to finish. Nasirzadeh said that "It is just one of Iran's UAV projects and one of our goals is to produce such planes. Because the world is moving towards that direction."

See also

References

Aircraft manufactured in Iran
Unmanned stealth aircraft
V-tail aircraft
Unmanned military aircraft of Iran